Claude Morley (22 June 1874 in Astley Bank, Blackheath – 13 November 1951 in Monk Soham House, Monk Soham Woodbridge, Suffolk) was an English antiquary and entomologist who specialised in Hymenoptera and Diptera. He has been described by Peter Marren as "Suffolk's best-known entomologist".

Morley was born in Blackheath and educated at Beccles, King's School, Peterborough and Epsom College. After living on the Isle of Wight in his father's house at Cowes, he moved in 1892 to Ipswich where worked with John Ellor Taylor, then Curator of the Ipswich Museum. He married in 1904, living in Monk Soham until his death. He had no radio, telephone, or electricity in his house. E.A. Elliott was a close friend as was Arthur Chitty.

Morley worked first on Coleoptera, then Hemiptera and then Ichneumonidae. His magnum opus was the five volume Ichneumons of Great Britain (1903–1914). 
Morley's collection of mainly Suffolk material covering the period 1898–1951 is in Ipswich Museum. It occupies c.260 drawers. There are Cerambycids bearing his name in the Kauffmann collection at Manchester.

Morley was a Fellow of the Entomological Society of London 1896. In 1929 he was one of the founding members of the Suffolk Naturalists' Society, and an editor of Transactions of the Suffolk Naturalists' Trust, the society's journal. Among pre-1950 British entomologists, Morley showed a relative interest in Irish fauna.

He also wrote poetry under the pseudonym of Maude Clorley.

Works

Hemiptera

Hymenoptera 
 
On the Ichneumonidous Group Tryphonides schizodonti with descriptions of new species (1905)
A description of the superior wing of the Hymenoptera, with a view to giving a simpler and more certain nomenclature to the alary system of Jurine.Trans. Ent. Soc. London, 1909: 439–447, figs. (1909)
Catalogue of British Hymenoptera of the family Chalcididae, 74pp. Publisher? (1910).
A revision of the Ichneumonidae based on the coll. in the British Museum Publisher? (1912-1914).
(1908-1911) Ichneumonologia Britannica (4 Volumes) London
On in some South African Ichneumonidae the collection of the South African Museum.Annals of the South African Museum,17:191-229. (1917)
Fauna of British India Hymenoptera Vol. 3. Ichneumones Deltoidei (1913)
The Percy Sladen trust Expedition to the Indian Ocean (Seychelles) in 1905. 12.Ichneumonidae (1912)

Coleoptera 
  Supplement, 1915. The work listed 1783 species and the supplement 237.

Morley also wrote many articles in the Entomologist's monthly magazine, Entomologist's Record and Journal of Variation, and other periodicals, and he was on the editorial staff of The Entomologist from 1909.

References

Anonym 1951: [Morley, C.] - Entomologist's Monthly Magazine (4) 87 327
Nash,D. A little-known important recorder of Suffolk insects, Ernest Arthur Elliott (1850-1936)’ White Admiral, Newsletter of the Suffolk Naturalists’ Soc., 65, 2006, pp. 23–30

Further reading

External links
Claude Morley in Biodiversity Heritage Library

1874 births
1951 deaths
People from Blackheath, London
English entomologists
Hymenopterists
Fellows of the Royal Entomological Society
People educated at The King's School, Peterborough